Beatriz Kicis Torrents de Sordi (born 19 September 1961), better known as Bia Kicis, is a Brazilian politician, activist, YouTuber, lawyer, and former attorney general for Brazil's Federal District, affiliated to the conservative Brazil Union. A self-declared right-winger, she defends the use of verifiable paper records to prevent electoral fraud in the Brazilian electronic voting system. Kicis was elected federal deputy for the Brazilian Chamber of Deputies in the 2018 general election.

Kicis signed the Madrid Charter, a document drafted by the right-wing Spanish party Vox that describes left-wing groups as enemies of Ibero-America involved in a "criminal project" that are "under the umbrella of the Cuban regime".

Personal life

Kicis is Roman Catholic and opposes to abortion.

References

External links
 Personal website 
 Bia Kicis on Twitter
 Bia Kicis on Facebook
 Bia Kicis on Instagram 
 Profile in the Chamber of Deputies

1976 births
Living people
Members of the Chamber of Deputies (Brazil) from the Federal District
Social Liberal Party (Brazil) politicians
Brazil Union politicians
Conservatism in Brazil
Brazilian activists
People from Resende
Brazilian Roman Catholics
21st-century Brazilian women politicians
Brazilian people of Lebanese-Jewish descent
Brazilian people of Italian descent
Signers of the Madrid Charter